Justin Alferman (born February 3, 1986) is an American politician who served in the Missouri House of Representatives from the 61st district from 2015 to 2018.

References

1986 births
Living people
Republican Party members of the Missouri House of Representatives
21st-century American politicians